Thomas L. Phillips (1924-2019) was a chairman and chief executive officer at Raytheon.

He was born in Istanbul in 1924 and graduated from the Boston Latin School. Mr. Phillips was hired by Raytheon in 1948. He started as an engineer, working his way up to managing positions. Eventually, in 1964, Mr. Phillips was hired as president. Thomas L. Phillips is credited with the creation of the Hawk missile. Under his direction Raytheon expanded into consumer markets, ultimately selling one of the first commercially available Microwaves. 

Mr. Phillips earned many honorary degrees from Babson College, Boston College, Gordon College, University of Massachusetts Amherst, University of Massachusetts Lowell, Northeastern University, Stonehill College, and Suffolk University. He was on the board of the Salvation Army, the executive committee of the United Ways of Eastern New England, the board of overseers of the Museum of Science, and a member of the corporation of the Joslin Diabetes Center. 

He died in 2019 and is survived by his three daughters and one son.

References

Raytheon Company people
American chief executives
1924 births
2019 deaths
American expatriates in Turkey